Hans Gildemeister and Andrés Gómez were the defending champions, but lost in the second round to Ronnie Båthman and Michiel Schapers.

Sergio Casal and Emilio Sánchez won the title by defeating Boris Becker and Eric Jelen 6–4, 6–1 in the final.

Seeds
The first four seeds received a bye to the second round.

Draw

Finals

Top half

Bottom half

References

External links
 Official results archive (ATP)
 Official results archive (ITF)

German Open - Doubles